is a train station located in Kurume, Fukuoka.

Lines
Nishi-Nippon Railroad
Amagi Line

Platforms

Adjacent stations

Surrounding area 
 Kyushu Expressway
 Kurume Business Plaza
 Miyanojin Post Office
 Koga Hospital 21

Railway stations in Fukuoka Prefecture
Railway stations in Japan opened in 1915